Kajaanin jäähalli is an indoor arena in Kajaani, Finland.  It is the home arena for Hokki of the Mestis hockey league.

References

Indoor arenas in Finland
Indoor ice hockey venues in Finland
Kajaani